Anil Sharma (born 3 July 1971) is an Indian Politician and a leader of Bharatiya Janata Party. He was elected to Delhi Legislative Assembly from R K Puram constituency in Fifth Delhi Assembly.

References

1971 births
Living people
Delhi MLAs 2013–2015
Bharatiya Janata Party politicians from Delhi
People from Delhi
Members of the Delhi Legislative Assembly